Ratzim Ladira ([We] Run to [the] Apartment/Home") is a reality television program aired in Israel, modeled on the American show The Amazing Race.

The show is staged as a series of contests, with the slowest competitor eliminated after each iteration. The winner of the show is awarded an apartment.

References

Israeli reality television series
Channel 2 (Israeli TV channel) original programming
2004 Israeli television series debuts